Osvaldo Carro (born 23 October 1973, in Colonia) was a Uruguayan football player who played as an attacking midfielder.

Career
Carro began playing professional football with Juventud de Las Piedras in 1990. After six seasons with Juventud he joined Montevideo side Centro Atlético Fenix for two seasons. Spells abroad in Ecuador and Australia followed.

Carro spent most of his career playing in Uruguay but he played abroad for the Queensland Roar in the Australian A-League and Macará in Ecuador.

References

1973 births
Living people
A-League Men players
Brisbane Roar FC players
Uruguayan footballers
Centro Atlético Fénix players
Plaza Colonia players
C.S.D. Macará footballers
Expatriate footballers in Ecuador
Expatriate soccer players in Australia
Uruguayan expatriates in Ecuador
Uruguayan expatriates in Australia

Association football midfielders